Cephalopholis taeniops, the African hind, bluespotted sea bass or spotted grouper, is a species of marine ray-finned fish, a grouper from the subfamily Epinephelinae which is in the family Serranidae which also includes the anthias and sea basses. This species occasionally makes its way into the aquarium trade and is a target for local fisheries. It is found in the eastern Atlantic Ocean.

Description
Cephalopholis taeniops has a basic colour of reddish orange with the head and body covered with small blue spots as are the dorsal fin, anal fin and caudal fin. The fins are blackish towards the margins while the soft-rayed part of the dorsal and anal fins and the caudal fin have a narrow bluish margin, There is a horizontal blue line immediately below eye. There is a much rarer black variety which also has blue spots. There are 9 spines and 15-16 soft rays in the dorsal fin while the anal fin has 3 spies and 9-10 soft rays. There are 68-72 scales in the lateral line, the pectoral fins are longer than the pelvic fins and the caudal fin is rounded.

Distribution
Cephalopholis taeniops is found in the eastern Atlantic Ocean along the western coast of Africa from Morocco to Angola. It is also found around the Cape Verde Islands and the islands in the Gulf of Guinea. In the Mediterranean Sea it was first recorded in the Gulf of Sirte (Libya) and later in Sicily (Italy), Malta, Israel, Lebanon and in the Aegean Sea. It has also been recorded around the Canary Islands where it is thought to have been introduced in ballast water discharged by oil platforms from West Africa.

Habitat and biology
Cephalopholis taeniops is a demersal species which can be found in shallow rocky reefs and on sandy bottoms. It is a diandric protogynous hermaphrodite. Some of the males do not necessarily have a functional female stage and may develop into males from sexually immature females.

Taxonomy
Cephalopholis taeniops was first formally described as Serranus taeniops in 1828 by the French zoologist Achille Valenciennes (1794-1865) with the type locality given as the Cape Verde Islands.

Utilisation
This species is important for commercial fisheries in Cape Verde and on a small scale in São Tomé and Príncipe but is not generally exploited elsewhere in its range. It has been recorded in the aquarium trade.

References

taeniops
Fish described in 1828